Diptendu Pramanick (July 18, 1910 – December 15, 1989) was a Bengali film personality from Calcutta. He was the founder secretary of the Eastern India Motion Pictures Association  in Calcutta, India - a fraternity of film personnel which is an interface between the entertainment industry of eastern India and the Government. During his multifarious career he came in contact with eminent personalities and saw the evolution of this organization from its initial days to being a regionwide entity.

Early life and education
He was born on  18 July 1910 in Calcutta. He was the eldest son of Sudhamoy Pramanick from Shantipur. He did his early schooling in Calcutta and then at the Raiganj Coronation School, Raiganj where his father practised as a lawyer.

In 1926 he returned to Calcutta and cleared Matriculation followed by the Intermediate examinations in Science in 1928. He then joined the Scottish Church College, Calcutta.

His interactions with many a revolutionary (due to his father's involvement with the Congress and the Satyagraha movement at Raigunj), the explosive air of the times, and the inspiration from a famous alumni (The Oaten Affair - Netaji Subhas Chandra Bose assaulted Prof Oaten due to the latter's derogatory comment on Indians )  probably drove him to antagonize an Indian-loathing teacher at Scottish Church College, and follow Bose's suit.

He later graduated from Asutosh College, and earned a bachelor's degree in science from the University of Calcutta in 1931.

Career
1931 - 1948
After leaving college, he worked as the Secretary to the then Mayor of Calcutta Sri Santosh Kumar Basu.  Out of his literary inclinations, he associated with literary conferences and Bengali literature fora. The 12th Prabasi Banga-Sahitya Sammelan was inaugurated by Rabindranath Tagore in Calcutta, December 1934 (Photo : The Reception Committee was chaired by Ramananda Chatterjee)..Also seen in the photograph is Akshay Kumar Nandi, father of Amala Sankar.

On completion of Mr Basu's term as Mayor, he became the Liaison Officer of Civil Defense and in the Publicity Section of the Commercial Museum. In 1942, he moved to the Home Department of the then Bengal Government as Liaison Officer, Civil Defense. The concept of Civil Defence owes its origin to erstwhile ARP Organisation raised and operated during World War II (1939–45) to safeguard the life and property of the civilian population and train the citizens to handle war time crisis.

At this time, Japan had overrun Burma and the threat of bombing was looming large on Calcutta. Eventually Japanese aircraft bombed Budge Budge (south of Calcutta).
A Bengali folk rhyme  captures this World War II event:

The bombing led to widespread panic - over a million people fled from the city and there was a huge pressure on civic authorities to control the situation. Indian Civil Defence Department expanded at a rapid pace to counter these threats and planned lighting restrictions, medical platoons, fire-fighting and rescue units. At the end of the war, the department was wound down starting 1947.

Subsequently, he tested his skills of entrepreneurship through a venture (Cine Furnishers Limited) with a couple of friends . It is here that he came in close contact with people of the Bengali film industry of Kolkata.

EIMPA

Enthused with these contacts, he joined an association of producers, distributors and exhibitors of Bengal (Bengal Motion Pictures Association) in 1948 as Secretary <ref>Screen Year Book & Who's who 1956, Express Newspapers Ltd., Mumbai, page 374</ref> while Sri B. N. Sircar was the President. Next year he started the BMPA journalErik Barnouw : Indian Film, Columbia University Press, New York (1963), pages 143, 206, 284. and was the editor  for more than two decades.
The Association was working on a rented premises at 125, Dharamtolla Street (now Lenin Sarani) which was moved to 2, Madan Street, Calcutta. The association grew under his leadership and moved into 98E Chowringhee Square (now 98E B.N. Sircar Sarani – EIMPA house - its present location ).

He was the first secretary of the then expanded Eastern India Motion Picture Association (EIMPA) and was instrumental in opening the EIMPA offices in Patna and Guwahati. In this period the uncertainties of war led to severe shortage of raw film stock in the country. A Film Advisory Committee was formed under the Government of India, and was given control of raw film stock distribution. EIMPA played an important role as a trade representative, negotiating materials for the film industry of eastern India and much of Diptendu's efforts were directed for the same.  During his tenure he also served as the Secretary of Film Federation of India (1953–1954). In 1956, Diptendu and other stalwarts like Satyajit Ray, Robert Hawkins, Vijaya Mulay and Dasgupta revived the Calcutta Film Society which witnessed the joining of 300 members.  The same team were then the prime movers behind the formation of the Federation of Film Societies of India (FFSI) in 1959 which was presided by Satyajit Ray, with Diptendu as the Jt. Treasurer  during which Indira Gandhi was a member of the FFSI (till 1964).

 First International Film Festival of India (IFFI), 1952

The Films Division of the Government of India sponsored and organized the First International Film Festival of India in 1952. BMPA played a pivotal role in organizing the festival in Calcutta. In his autobiography he wrote 
This photograph depicts his welcoming at the Dum Dum Airport as in his autobiography, with the who's who of Calcutta Filmdom.

First film seminar, 1955
Sangeet Natak Akademi convened the first film seminar at Delhi and it was inaugurated by Prime Minister Pandit Jawaharlal Nehru. Prominent film personality attended this seminar 

Twilight years
In the early 1970s, he was still getting nominated to committees  - representing the Cinema trade for their infrastructural and legal issues, including the significant 1967-68 and the 1973-74 Parliamentary Estimates Committee.

The elaborate reports of the 1968 & 1973 Committees raised issues about institutional finances, cess based state funding of cinema, creating a generation of ‘low-budget’ stars to counter the lopsided economics of a star-heavy industry and censorship reforms. In that sense the report anticipated the birth of a generation of stars from the state-driven FTII in the Naseeruddin Shah and Smita Patil era.

The Pramanick family

Legacy
Children from many underprivileged families of Dahuka, a remote village in Bardhaman district, receive school books from the Diptendu Pramanick Book fund'' every year, during a ceremony held on the occasion of the Saraswati Puja.
The apex body of film distributors and producers (EIMPA) continues to help the industry facing the challenges of corporatisation, censorship, piracy and "multiplexes".

References

External links

Ashutosh College
Scottish Church College, Calcutta
History of Scottish Church College
EIMPA blog
Sangeet Natak Akademi, Delhi
Federation of Film Societies of India
Timeline for Cinematography In India 
Film events of 1940s
Village Dahuka in Bardhaman district

 
People from Kolkata
Scottish Church College alumni
Asutosh College alumni
University of Calcutta alumni
Culture of Kolkata
Bengali people
Shantipur
1910 births
1989 deaths
Cinema of Bengal
Sangeet Natak Akademi
People from New Alipore